Newfoundland Holiday is a Canadian nature and travel documentary television series which aired on CBC Television from 1973 to 1974.

Premise
Dave Quinton hosted this series profiled various locations in Newfoundland, particularly featuring its nature and wildlife. Some filmed material from the Newfoundland Tourist Bureau was included in the series. Newfoundland Holiday was produced in St. John's.

Scheduling
This half-hour series was broadcast on Thursday afternoons for two seasons, first at 5:00 p.m. (Eastern) from 7 June to 16 August 1973 then at 4:30 p.m. from 4 July to 5 September 1974.

References

External links
 

CBC Television original programming
1973 Canadian television series debuts
1974 Canadian television series endings